Maskarada (English: The Masquerade) is the ninth studio album by Serbian singer Ceca. It was released in 1997.

Track listing
Maskarada 
Nevaljala
Pogrešan broj
Kažem da te volim
Nagovori 
Vreteno
Noćas kuća časti 
Da ne čuje zlo
I bogati plaču

References

1997 albums
Ceca (singer) albums